Glinde may refer to several places in Germany:

 Glinde, Schleswig-Holstein, a town in Schleswig-Holstein
 Glinde, Saxony-Anhalt, part of the town Barby, district of Salzlandkreis, Saxony-Anhalt
 a part of the village Oerel, itself part of the Samtgemeinde Geestequelle, district  of Rotenburg, Lower Saxony 
 a part of Bad Oldesloe, Schleswig-Holstein

See also: Glynde